Clifford Lorrie Hunter  (11 May 1900 – 1 July 1990) was a New Zealand politician of the Labour Party.

Early life and family
Hunter was born at Waimea West on 11 May 1900, the son of Gordon MacKay Hunter and Edith Constance Hunter (née Andrews). His father was an "active supporter" of Independent MHR for Nelson, Harry Atmore. Hunter married Theresa Anne Gertrude Pye in Wellington on 24 August 1921.

After leaving school Hunter became a flax and scrub cutter before moving to Wellington in 1920 to become a tram driver. He joined the trade union movement and became president of the Wellington Tramways' Union and later vice-president of the Tramways Federation of New Zealand. He was also a dominion councillor of the Alliance of Labour and a long time member of the Workers' Educational Association (WEA).

Political career

Shortly after moving to Wellington in 1920 Hunter joined the Labour Party and was secretary of Labour's Island Bay branch. Initially he was set to stand in  but changed to Manawatu at the insistence of Labour's general-secretary Walter Nash. In , Hunter in turn beat Linklater. In , Hunter was defeated by National’s John Cobbe.

Later life and death
After his defeat he moved to Auckland to take up a position as a conciliation commissioner where he mediated between workers and employers in industrial disputes. He retired from the role in 1969 but was recalled to his position temporarily in 1974 when the entire industrial award system had to be re-negotiated following then end of economic stabilisation regulations.

In the 1987 Queen's Birthday Honours, Hunter was awarded the Queen's Service Medal for public services. Earlier that year he had tacitly supported many of the controversial "Rogernomics" reforms. In 1990, he was awarded the New Zealand 1990 Commemoration Medal.

He died in Waitakere Hospital in 1990, survived by his son and four daughters (his wife Anne having predeceased him in 1965). At the time of his death he was the last surviving member of the First Labour Government. He was buried in Purewa Cemetery, Auckland.

Notes

References

1900 births
1990 deaths
New Zealand Labour Party MPs
People from Brightwater
Recipients of the Queen's Service Medal
New Zealand MPs for North Island electorates
Members of the New Zealand House of Representatives
Unsuccessful candidates in the 1938 New Zealand general election
Unsuccessful candidates in the 1931 New Zealand general election
Burials at Purewa Cemetery
New Zealand trade unionists